The East Bay Lumberjacks are an independent professional baseball team based out of Concord, California.  The team currently competes in the San Francisco Money Baseball League.

History 
The Lumberjacks were members of the Pacific Association of Professional Baseball Clubs in 2013, playing their home games at Laney College in Oakland. They were the only franchise in the league to share a location with a Major League Baseball club, the Oakland Athletics, though they are not affiliated with either MLB or Minor League Baseball. Prior to their entrance into professional ranks, they were founded as a semi-pro team affiliated with the Sacramento Rural League in 2009 by Thomas Macari and Scott Price.

In 2013, the Lumberjacks started the season as a guest team in the Pacific Association. On July 5th, the Pacific Association announced the admission of the East Bay Lumberjacks as a full league member. The Lumberjacks traveled to Hawaii on two separate occasions to play the Hawaii Stars and Na Koa Ikaika Maui. In August, the East Bay Lumberjacks would become the Bay Cal Lumberjacks.  

After a 7–29 Pacific Association season, The team did not return for the 2014 season, and were replaced in the league by the Pittsburg Mettle.

In Winter 2014 the Lumberjacks joined the four-team San Francisco Money League, playing a schedule from November to February. Finishing 7-1 in the regular season the Lumberjacks defeated Castro Valley Braves in a best-of 3 championship series.

Season-by-season results

References

External links
 Official website

Professional baseball teams in California
Oakland, California
Sports teams in Oakland, California